C.J.A. Ericson was an Iowa businessman and politician.  He represented a district in Iowa's Boone and Story counties five times as a senator in the Iowa General Assembly.

While in the state legislature he advocated for libraries on a statewide level. He was also a longtime member of the Iowa Library Association.  He donated funds enabling the construction of the Ericson Public Library.

The names of Ericson Hall and Ericson Field and Ericson Park at Augustana College honored him for his matching donation of $12,800 enabling purchase of land vitally needed for expansion of the college.  The Ericson Hall building was removed in 1939 to make way for the Ericson Athletic Stadium.

His 10-room, $8,000 home in Boone was commissioned to be designed by noted architect George E. Hallett of Des Moines and was to be "modern colonial" in style, adapting "the best of the old and the best of the new styles and arrangement.".

Documents of the Historical Department of Iowa records its 1903 addition to their collection of a bust of C.J.A. Ericson created by the Pugi Brothers studio of Florence, Italy.

References

Iowa state senators